The 1991 Albanian Supercup was the second edition of the Albanian Supercup, an annual Albanian football match. The match was contested by Dinamo Tirana, champions of the 1989–90 Albanian Superliga and 1989–90 Albanian Cup, and Flamurtari Vlorë, which was the runner-up in cup. It was held at the Qemal Stafa Stadium on 11 January 1991.

The regular and extra-time finished in a 3–3 draw, with Flamurtari's Sokol Kushta notably scoring a hat-trick. Dinamo Tirana then won on penalty shootouts.

Match details

See also
 1989–90 Albanian Superliga
 1989–90 Albanian Cup

References

1990
Supercup
Albanian Supercup, 1990
Albanian Supercup, 1990